Miss International Queen 2019, the 14th Miss International Queen pageant, was held on 8 March 2019, at Pattaya, Chonburi in Thailand. Nguyễn Hương Giang from Vietnam crowned her successor, Jazell Barbie Royale of the United States at the end of the event.

Results 

Notes:

§ – placed into the Top 12 by winning Most Popular Introductory Video

Special awards

Best in Evening Gown

Best in Talent

Contestants 
21 contestants competed for the title.

Debuts

Returns 
Last competed in 2010:

Withdraws

References

External links 

 

2019 beauty pageants
2019
Beauty pageants in Thailand